Anne McEnerny-Ogle is an American politician and educator, serving as the 58th Mayor of Vancouver, Washington.

Education 
McEnerny-Ogle earned a Bachelor of Science in education from southern Oregon State College, and a Master of Education from Lewis & Clark College.

Career 
Prior to entering politics, McEnerny-Ogle spent 30 years as a public school teacher in Lake Oswego, Oregon. In 2014, McEnerny-Ogle was elected to the Vancouver City Council.

The first female elected mayor of Vancouver, she was elected to succeed Tim Leavitt in November 2017 for a term beginning January 1, 2018. She was endorsed in the race by The Columbian, which noted her prior term on the city council since 2014. She was also on the Vancouver Planning Commission and several other local government boards. The mayoral office is officially nonpartisan.

See also
List of mayors of Vancouver, Washington

References

External links 
 Official city biography

21st-century American politicians
21st-century American women politicians
Women mayors of places in Washington (state)
Living people
Women city councillors in Washington (state)
Educators from Oregon
Politicians from Vancouver, Washington
1954 births
Southern Oregon University alumni
Lewis & Clark College alumni